Serratozaena paraphysea is a species of beetle in the family Carabidae, the only species in the genus Serratozaena.

References

Paussinae